Iodine tribromide is an interhalogen with chemical formula IBr3.

Properties
Iodine tribromide is a dark brown liquid that is miscible with ethanol and ethers.

Uses 
Iodine tribromide can be used as a brominated flame retardant when producing semiconductors. It also can be used in dry etching.

References 

Bromides
Iodine compounds
Interhalogen compounds